Adnan Ahmed (born 1 December 1977) is an Egyptian field hockey player. He competed in the 2004 Summer Olympics.

References

External links

1977 births
Living people
Field hockey players at the 2004 Summer Olympics
Egyptian male field hockey players
Olympic field hockey players of Egypt